Zakal is a dispersed settlement in the hills northwest of Kamnik in the Upper Carniola region of Slovenia.

The local church, dedicated to Saint Florian, is an example of a medieval church with a flat ceiling and two gilded altars.

References

External links
Zakal on Geopedia

Populated places in the Municipality of Kamnik